Gavin Rothery may refer to:

Gavin Rothery (film creator), British screenwriter, director and designer
Gavin Rothery (footballer) (born 1987), English footballer